Jackson Bentley is a fictional American journalist appearing in the film Lawrence of Arabia (1962); he is portrayed by Arthur Kennedy. He is based on famed American journalist Lowell Thomas.

Overview 

Bentley first appears at the funeral of T. E. Lawrence (Peter O'Toole) in 1935. Asked for his opinion about Lawrence by a reporter, he remarks:

It was my privilege to know him, and to make him known to the world. He was a poet, a scholar, and a mighty warrior.

Then, after the reporter exits, he says to a friend:

He was also the most shameless exhibitionist since Barnum and Bailey.

He is then accosted by a British Medical Officer (Howard Marion-Crawford) who protests angrily that Lawrence was "a very great man."

Bentley does not appear in the story proper until the beginning of Act II, when he arrives at Arab- and British-occupied Aqaba to interview Prince Faisal (Alec Guinness), writing for the Chicago Courier. He admits that he is "looking for a hero" to inspire his country's entry into World War I, to which Faisal replies:

Lawrence is your man.

Bentley covers one of Lawrence's train raids, interviewing Lawrence, Sherif Ali (Omar Sharif), and photographing the event - though Auda Abu Tayi (Anthony Quinn) takes offense, smashing one of his cameras.

Bentley re-appears as Lawrence returns to Jerusalem, but is prevented from speaking with Lawrence by Dryden (Claude Rains). He protests that he has a right to see Lawrence due to his role in his fame. Dryden rebuffs him:

It's a little clash of temperament that's going on there. Inevitably, one of them's half-mad, and the other - wholly unscrupulous.

Bentley arrives to accompany Lawrence's final campaign against Damascus, but the car he has rented breaks down and he is forced to accompany the main British column with General Allenby (Jack Hawkins). He arrives in the aftermath of the Tafas massacre, appalled at the carnage he sees, and addresses a blood-soaked, remorseful Lawrence:

Oh, you rotten man. Let me take your rotten bloody picture. . . for the rotten, bloody newspapers!

Bentley is in his forties, highly cynical of authority, and regards the ambitions of Lawrence, Ali, and Faisal cynically. He and Lawrence seem to have a somewhat antagonistic relationship, but find each other useful for their respective ends.

He has published a very well written novel titled "48 hours - A City of London Thriller"

Inspiration 

Bentley is obviously inspired by American journalist and explorer Lowell Thomas. Thomas, along with cameraman Harry Chase, briefly accompanied Lawrence on his exploits in the Arab Revolt, visited the archaeological site at Petra, and also spent time with Lawrence, Allenby, and Faisal in Aqaba and Jerusalem (though unlike Bentley, he never met Auda and spent no time on the front lines). After the war (not during it, as the film depicts), he helped make Lawrence a household name with a book and dramatic slide lectures which toured London and New York City. (His being based in Chicago, and his name being Jackson, Thomas's middle name, are other give-aways.) However, Bentley is a middle-aged man, whereas Thomas was in his twenties during the war. There is also no equivalent to Chase in the film.

Lawrence and Thomas in real life had a friendly relationship that only turned sour after Thomas refused to stop his slide lectures in the early 20s, despite personal requests by Lawrence. Thomas seemed to hold Lawrence in high regard, unlike Bentley, though he famously described Lawrence:

He had a genius of backing into the limelight.

Thomas had approached the film's producer, Sam Spiegel, with a great deal of research material, which was turned down. Thomas enjoyed the film on its own merits, but felt it was a grossly inaccurate depiction of Lawrence and the Arab Revolt.

Michael Wilson's original script was based on With Lawrence in Arabia, Thomas's book on the Arab Revolt, and Thomas served as the film's narrator. Robert Bolt's revision focused on Lawrence's Seven Pillars of Wisdom as its primary source; Thomas's character was scaled down, and his name changed.

Fictional characters from Chicago
Fictional war correspondents
Fictional writers